Arlington Mill Reservoir, known locally as "Arlington Pond", is a  impoundment located in Rockingham County in southern New Hampshire, United States, in the town of Salem. It is located along the Spicket River, a small stream that flows south to the Merrimack River in Lawrence, Massachusetts.

The lake is classified as a warmwater fishery, with observed species including smallmouth bass, largemouth bass, chain pickerel, horned pout, white perch, black crappie, and bluegill. There is no public boat access.

See also

List of lakes in New Hampshire
Canobie Lake

References

Lakes of Rockingham County, New Hampshire
Reservoirs in New Hampshire